Novodmitriyevka (Şobıtlı) is a rural locality (a selo) in Tarumovsky District, Republic of Dagestan, Russia. The population was 2,293 as of 2010. There are 18 streets.

Geography 
Novodmitriyevka is located 7 km west of Tarumovka (the district's administrative centre) by road. Tarumovka is the nearest rural locality.

References 

Rural localities in Tarumovsky District